Dripping Springs may refer to the following places in the United States:

 Dripping Springs, Carter County, Oklahoma
 Dripping Springs, Delaware County, Oklahoma
 Dripping Springs Park, formerly Dripping Springs State Park, in Okmulgee County, Oklahoma
 Dripping Springs, Texas
 Natural Falls State Park, formerly known as known as Dripping Springs, in the Ozarks, in Delaware County, Oklahoma. 
 Dripping Springs Natural Area, in the Organ Mountains, New Mexico
 Dripping Springs Trail, Grand Canyon, Arizona

See also
 Dripping liquid
 Spring (hydrology)